Wanda Ventham (born 5 August 1935) is an English actress with many roles on British television since beginning her career in the 1950s. She played Colonel Virginia Lake in the 1970s science-fiction television series UFO and had a recurring role as Cassandra Trotter's mother Pamela Parry in the sitcom Only Fools and Horses between 1989 and 1992. Her many other television appearances include The Sweeney, The Avengers, The Saint, Doctor Who, The Gentle Touch, Heartbeat and Holby City, and she appeared in two Carry On films.

In April 2014, People magazine featured her in its "Most Beautiful People in the World" edition.

Early life
Ventham was born in Brighton on 5 August 1935, the daughter of Gladys Frances (née Holtham) and Frederick Howard Ventham. Originally aspiring to become an artist, she attended art school for a year whilst working as a scenic painter for the Connaught Theatre in Worthing, West Sussex, during her school holidays. The exposure to professional theatre prompted her to leave art school and pursue a career in acting. She trained at the Central School of Speech and Drama, as a contemporary of Judi Dench, graduating in 1956.

Career
Ventham's first film role was in My Teenage Daughter (1956), with Dame Anna Neagle and Sylvia Syms. She also appeared as a debutante in 1962 with a ten-second talking role in the Norman Wisdom film On the Beat and in 1963 as a nurse in the Norman Wisdom film A Stitch in Time – both were uncredited.

She also appeared in Carry On Cleo (1964) and Carry On Up the Khyber (1968). She starred alongside Mark Burns in the mystery film Death Is a Woman (1966). Her best-known role was on television as Col. Virginia Lake, second-in-command to Commander Ed Straker (Ed Bishop), in the cult series UFO.

Ventham's numerous other TV credits include regular roles in Heartbeat as Fiona Weston, Hetty Wainthropp Investigates as Margaret Balshaw, and The Rag Trade as Shirley. She also played a love interest for Arthur Daley in Minder, Susan's mother in Coupling, and Deborah's mother in Men Behaving Badly. She starred opposite Ian Hendry in the 15-part BBC series The Lotus Eaters (1972–73), and made a guest appearance on the BBC Two sketch show Rutland Weekend Television (Se1Ep5). She was in an episode of Danger Man, and the series Patrick McGoohan completed immediately afterwards – the allegorical spy series The Prisoner – as well as the sitcoms Executive Stress and Next of Kin, and the sketch show The Two Ronnies.

She has appeared in Doctor Who on three occasions over three decades; as Jean Rock in The Faceless Ones (1967), as Thea Ransome in Image of the Fendahl (1977) and as Faroon in Time and the Rani (1987). Her appearance in Image of the Fendahl was opposite Denis Lill, with whom she would later act when they were cast as Pamela and Alan Parry in the sitcom Only Fools and Horses (1989–1992).

In 2014, she and her husband Timothy Carlton appeared in the BBC adaptation of Sherlock as the parents of Sherlock Holmes, who is played by their son Benedict Cumberbatch. Ventham appeared in Holby City as Sheilagh Chiltern, the grandmother of Lofty Chiltern.

Personal life
Ventham married her first husband James Tabernacle in 1957 and they had one daughter, Tracy. They were divorced on 12 November 1974. She met actor Timothy Carlton in 1970 while filming sequences for the drama series A Family at War and they have been married since April 1976. The couple appeared together in the second series of BBC drama The Lotus Eaters in 1973, and in the third and fourth series of BBC's Sherlock in 2014 and 2017, where they played the title character's parents, with their son, actor Benedict Cumberbatch starring in the titular role of Holmes.

Filmography

Film

Television

Theatre

References

External links

Living people
20th-century English actresses
21st-century English actresses
Actresses from Brighton
Alumni of the Royal Central School of Speech and Drama
Cumberbatch family
English film actresses
English stage actresses
English television actresses
People from Brighton
1935 births